The Civil List Act 1837 (1 & 2 Vict. c. 2) was an Act of Parliament in the United Kingdom, signed into law on 23 December 1837.

It reiterated the principles of the civil list system, stating that the newly accessioned Queen Victoria undertook to transfer all hereditary revenues of the Crown to the Treasury during her reign, and that all existing Acts to this end were to remain in force. The sum of £385,000 was to be payable annually out of the Consolidated Fund for the upkeep of the royal household, applied as laid down in a schedule, and the sum of £200,000 granted for this purpose during the previous session was to be considered part of the first payment.

An additional £1,200 per annum was granted to defray the cost of civil list pensions. This was given on the condition that any new pensions granted would be given only to those who had "just claims on the royal benefice" or those who had gained the gratitude of the sovereign and the country for personal services to the Crown, or for public duties, or for services to the arts, science or literature. A list of all pensions was to be laid before Parliament. The hereditary duties on beer, ale and cider were to be remitted during the Queen's lifetime, and any powers exercised by the Crown relating to the small branches of hereditary revenue were unaffected.

Finally, the Act granted £10,000 for home secret service.

{| align="center" style="width:50%" border="1"
|-align="center"
|colspan="3"|Schedule
|-
|First class || for the Queen's privy purse ||align="right"| £60,000
|-
|Second class || salaries of the Queen's household and retired allowances ||align="right"| £131,260
|-
|Third class || expenses of the Queen's household ||align="right"| £172,500
|-
|Fourth class || royal bounty, alms, and special services ||align="right"| £13,200
|-
|Fifth class || pensions ||align="right"| £——
|-
|Sixth class || unappropriated monies ||align="right"| £8,040
|-align="right"
| colspan="2"|Total || £385,000
|-size="small"
| colspan="3"|Note that the £1,200 paid for pensions was an additional payment, and not part of the £385,000 total
|}

See also
 Pensions in the United Kingdom

References
The British almanac of the Society for the Diffusion of Useful Knowledge, for the year 1839. The Society for the Diffusion of Useful Knowledge, London, 1839.

External links

1837 in British law
United Kingdom Acts of Parliament 1837